Carriles is a surname. Notable people with the surname include:

Eduardo Carriles (1923–2020), Spanish lawyer, businessman and politician 
José Manuel Carriles (born 1963), Spanish golfer
Luis Posada Carriles (1928–2018), Cuban exile militant and Central Intelligence Agency agent
Lupe Carriles (1913–1964), Mexican character actress